Reuben Nero, better known by his stage name Papa Reu, is a Trinidad & Tobago-born rapper, singer, producer, song writer from Houston, Texas. He is also a former member of hip-hop record label Cash Money Records.<ref>[http://articles.chicagotribune.com/2006-02-17/entertainment/0602170313_1_papa-reu-ear-sublime Chicago Tribune Chicago Tribune: papa Reu – Life & Music (Sanctuary)]</ref> He has established his own record label Reu Muzik, Inc. through which he has released three albums, namely Xcuse Me, U Know Me, and Certified.

Biography

Music career
At the age of 16, Reu and his brother relocated to Houston, TX where he began affiliating himself within the local hip-hop scene and became a pioneer of Houston's popular underground rap movement.

With his unique island sound, southern street savvy, and a respect of music history, 8Ball and MJG caught his act. The duo enlisted Reu for an appearance on their 1994 album On the Outside Looking In. A few independent singles hit the streets during the late 1990s along with appearances on albums by Mr. Coop and Field Mob, but it wasn't until 2000 that Papa Reu broke out on his own with the full-length Xcuse Me! on his own Reu Muzik, then released U Know Me a year later, and while the album sold well regionally, it was his 2002 appearance on the 504 Boyz's hit single "Tight Whips" that would make him a Southern rap player.

Much of his early success came with Cash Money Records being featured on early multi-platinum recordings, such as The Big Tymers' "Lick Them Up Shots", Juvenile's "Rich Ni**az" and Lil Wayne's "Not Like Me". He was featured in H-Town track "Buss One", Solange Knowles in "Don't Fight the Feeling" in the original soundtrack of The Fighting Temptations and in 504 Boyz' track "Tight Whips" also featuring Slay Sean, 5th Ward Weebie, Lil' Romeo and Little D. Other featured recordings include tracks with Changin' Lanes, Z-Ro Tolerance and Miss Mykie

Papa Reu has collaborated with a number of artists like YZ & Gemini in "Hold on"(2007), Billy Cook in "Bubble Eye" (2008), Lil Keke in "Diamond and Pearls" (2008) and Rick Ross in "Put It in the Air" (2010).

Discography

Albums
 2000: Xcuse Me 2001: U Know Me 2003: CertifiedMixtapes
2013: Reu'D Boy''

Singles
2010: "Put It in the Air" (feat. Rick Ross)
2010: "Bumble Bee (What The Buzz About)"

References

External links

Facebook

Living people
Rappers from Houston
American rappers of Trinidad and Tobago descent
Date of birth missing (living people)
21st-century American rappers
1972 births